Amber Simone Sherlock (née Higlett) is an Australian journalist, television news presenter and reporter. She currently presents the weather on Nine News Sydney and previously hosted the daily national one hour news bulletin Nine News Now.

Career
Sherlock began her career at the Seven Network in Sydney and worked for the financial news service at the Commonwealth Bank before joining Network Ten for the Sydney Olympics. She then moved into finance journalism, taking a position in London for several years. She came back to Canberra as a host for a Network Ten current affairs program. Upon her return to Sydney, Sherlock went to work for Commonwealth Securities as a financial journalist, after which she took a position as a newsreader with Sky News Australia.

Sherlock joined the Nine Network in 2007 to present the business segments for the Today, Nine Morning News Hour and Nine Afternoon News. She was the news presenter on Weekend Today and Monday news presenter on Today. Sherlock later presented the morning edition of the Qantas Inflight News. In January 2009, it was announced that Sherlock would be the news presenter for Weekend Today, alongside co-hosts Cameron Williams and Leila McKinnon. In July 2009, Sherlock was appointed Monday news presenter for Today, as Georgie Gardner presents Nine News Sydney on Friday and Saturday.

Sherlock is represented by the management company 22.

Personal life
Sherlock is a graduate of the University of Technology, Sydney.

In June 2010, Amber gave birth to a daughter. She went into labour while on air during Weekend Today.

In April 2014, Sherlock gave birth to a son.

Controversy
On 12 January 2017, footage was leaked showing Sherlock off-air having an outburst during an advert break on Nine News Now because she and fellow journalist reporter Julie Snook were both wearing the same colour white (though Snook argued she was actually wearing a shade of light blue), as well as guest psychologist Sandy Rea. Sherlock stated "we cannot all be in white" for the talk segment and demanded that Snook put on a jacket.

In a statement to 9Honey, Sherlock said that she "probably overreacted" over the situation and that "Live TV can be a pretty stressful beast, at times." Snook told 9Honey that she and Sherlock were still friends and that she does enjoy working with her. The footage was featured on Jimmy Kimmel Live! as part of Jimmy Kimmel's opening for the show. Kimmel said in his opening monologue "I don't know who decided to release this tape but whoever that was I just want to say thank you from the bottom of my heart," It was stated that the staff member at Nine who leaked the video would face disciplinary action, with insiders calling it a "sackable" offence.

References

External links
Nine News

Nine News presenters
Australian reporters and correspondents
Living people
1975 births
Journalists from Sydney